Tre Whyte (born 20 October 1993) is a British male former BMX rider. In 2014 he claimed bronze in the 2014 UCI BMX World Championships after having to self-fund his attendance due to not being selected by the British Cycling World Championship team. He competed in the time trial event at the 2015 UCI BMX World Championships. He was not selected for the 2016 World Championships, despite being the British National Champion, and was unable to self-fund his attendance due to rule changes. He retired from competition in 2020. During his career he was supported by the Dame Kelly Holmes Trust. Following his retirement from BMX, Whyte took up scooter racing. His brother Kye White also competes for Britain.

References

External links
 
 

1993 births
Living people
BMX riders
British male cyclists
English motorcycle racers
Place of birth missing (living people)